The Hilton family is an American family that originally comes from San Antonio, New Mexico, and spans over four generations from New York City and Los Angeles. The family members hold varying degrees of power, wealth and status as socialites in the United States. They are widely known for the Hilton Hotels & Resorts Group which was established by Conrad Hilton in 1919 when he bought his first hotel. 

The Hilton family is one of the world's most powerful and famous families and are worth over $14.2 billion dollars.

Family tree 

 Halvor Nilsen Hilton (1810–1864), m. Karoline Hansdatter "Kari" Holum.
 Augustus Halvorson "Gus" Hilton b. Norway (1854–1919), m. Mary Genevieve Laufersweiler (1863–1956).
 Gus emigrated to the United States in 1870.
 Felice A. Hilton (1885–1968)
 Conrad Hilton (1887–1979)
 Eva C. Hilton (1889–1979)
 Carl H. Hilton (1892–1957)
 Julian Hilton (1895–1897)
 Rosemary J. Hilton (1898–1995)
 August H. "Boy" Hilton (1901–1929)
 Helen A. Hilton (1906–1903)

Conrad Hilton descendants
 By first wife Mary Adelaide Barron (m. 1925, div. 1934)
 Conrad Nicholson "Nicky" Hilton Jr. (1926–1969), m. Patricia "Trish" McClintock.  He was also the first husband of Elizabeth Taylor (1932–2011; m. 1950, div. 1951), though they had no children together.
 Conrad Nicholson Hilton, III (b. 1960)
 Michael Otis Hilton (b. 1961), m. Babita Hilton.
 Michael Bradford Hilton (b. 1994)
 Jasmine Blake Hilton (b. 1999)
 Isabelle Hilton (b. 2008)
 William Barron Hilton (1927–2019), m. Marilyn Hawley.
 William Barron Hilton, Jr. (b. 1948)
 Hawley Anne Hilton (b. 1949), m. Jack McAuliffe
 Justin Hawley McAuliffe (b. 1987)
 Steven Michael Hilton (b. 1950)
 Nicholas Conrad Hilton (b. 1984)
 David Alan Hilton (b. 1952)
 Sharon Constance Hilton (b. 1953)
 Richard Howard Hilton (b. 1955), m. Kathy Richards (half-sister of Kim and Kyle Richards)
 Paris Whitney Hilton (b. 1981), m. Carter Milliken Reum in 2021
 Phoenix Barron Hilton Reum (b. 2023)
 Nicholai Olivia ("Nicky") Hilton (b. 1983), m. James Rothschild in 2015
 Lily-Grace Victoria Rothschild (b. 2016)
 Teddy Marilyn Rothschild (b. 2017)
 son (b. 2022)
 Barron Nicholas Hilton II (b. 1989), m. Tessa Gräfin von Walderdorff in 2017
 Milou Alizée Hilton (b. 2020)
 Caspian Barron Hilton (b. 2022)
 Conrad Hughes Hilton (b. 1994)
 Daniel Kevin Hilton (b. 1962)
 Richard Douglas Hilton (b. 1990)
 Ronald Jeffrey Hilton (b. 1963)
 Eric Michael Hilton (1932–2016)
 Eric Michael Hilton, Jr. (b. 1955-2019)
 Caitlin Patricia Davis Hilton (b. 1994)
 Beverly Ann Hilton (b. 1956)
 Linda Hilton (b. 1963)  m. Fabrizio Buschini 1992
 Nicholas Angelo Buschini (b. 1993)m. Emily Rose Banas 2022
 Brandon Alexandro Buschini (b. 1995)
 Joseph Bradley Hilton (b. 1967)
 Darren Joseph Hilton (b. 1995)
 Dean Bradley Hilton (b. 1995)
 Allison Elaine Hilton (b. 2002)
 By second wife Zsa Zsa Gabor (1917–2016; m. 1942, div. 1946)
 Constance Francesca Gabor Hilton (1947–2015) Francesca was the only child born to any of the Gabor sisters. She had no children and was divorced.
 No children by third wife Mary Frances Kelly (m. 1976)..

References

External links
Ancestry of Paris Hilton

American families of German ancestry
American socialites
Families of German ancestry
Conrad Hilton family
American people of Norwegian descent
Bavarian emigrants to the United States
People from Fürth
People from Ullensaker
Roman Catholic families
American hoteliers